The Hungarian Regional Autonomy is the name of a proposed new administrative unit in the northern part of the Autonomous Province of Vojvodina in Serbia. 

It forms a part of the political program of the Alliance of Vojvodina Hungarians, but the idea is also supported by several other ethnic Hungarian political parties in Serbia.
The area of autonomy would be 3,813 km²

Proposal
The creation of this new administrative unit was proposed by the Alliance of Vojvodina Hungarians political party. In this proposal, the Hungarian Regional Autonomy is proposed to be an autonomous region in the northern part of Vojvodina including the nine municipalities of northern Vojvodina: Subotica, Bačka Topola, Mali Iđoš, Kanjiža, Senta, Ada, Bečej, Čoka, and Novi Kneževac. The administrative centre of the region would be Subotica, while the region itself would be part of Vojvodina within Serbia. The proposal for the creation of the Hungarian Regional Autonomy is based on the autonomy model of South Tyrol in Italy.

Besides the Alliance of Vojvodina Hungarians and its coalition partners from Hungarian Coalition, some other ethnic Hungarian political parties and movements, like Hungarian Civic Alliance and 64 Counties Movement also advocating territorial autonomy for ethnic Hungarians in Vojvodina and Serbia.

Some variants of these proposals advocating that only 8 municipalities should be included into Hungarian autonomous region, excluding the municipality of Novi Kneževac, which have a Serb ethnic majority. Contrary to this, the proposal of the 64 Counties Movement advocates creation of Hungarian autonomous region in much larger territory, which would include not only municipalities with Hungarian majority or plurality, but also sizable neighboring areas, where several notable towns with Serb ethnic majority are located.

Demographics
According to the 2011 census data, the proposed new region would have a population composed of 49.6% Hungarians, 26.9% Serbs, 4.8% Croats, 4.4% Bunjevci, 2.2% Romani, and others.

Some 61.1% of all Hungarians living in Serbia and 61.8% of all Hungarians living in Vojvodina would live within the borders of the proposed region.

The municipalities with Hungarian ethnic majority are: Kanjiža (85.1%), Senta (79.1%), Ada (75%), Bačka Topola (58%), Mali Iđoš (53.9%). Hungarians make plurality of the population in Čoka (49.6%).

The Novi Kneževac municipality has a Serb ethnic majority (57.2%).

The municipalities of Subotica, Bečej and Čoka are ethnically mixed. The population of Subotica municipality is composed of 35.6% Hungarians, 27% Serbs, 10% Croats, 9.5% Bunjevci, etc. The population of Bečej municipality is composed of 46.3% Hungarians, 41.3% Serbs, 2.2% Roma, etc. The population of Čoka municipality is composed of 49.6% Hungarians, 38.9% Serbs, 3.8% Roma, etc.

Support for the idea

In the 2016 local elections, the Alliance of Vojvodina Hungarians won the largest number of seats in the municipal parliaments of Subotica, Kanjiža, Senta, Bačka Topola, Mali Iđoš, and Čoka. Serbian Progressive Party won more votes than the Alliance of Vojvodina Hungarians in Bečej, in which relative majority of population is of Hungarian ethnicity.

See also
 Hungarians in Serbia

References

External links
 Savez vojvođanskih Mađara (in Serbian) 
 Vajdasági Magyar Szövetség (in Hungarian)

Politics of Vojvodina
Politics of Serbia